Alfonso D'Artega (June 5, 1907 – January 20, 1998), often known simply as D'Artega, was a songwriter, conductor, arranger and actor. His song "In the Blue of Evening", co-written with Tom Adair, was a number one hit for the Tommy Dorsey Orchestra in 1943.

D'Artega was born in Silao, Guanajuato, Mexico. His family emigrated to the U.S. in 1918. D'Artega studied music and composition at Strassberger's Conservatory in St. Louis, Missouri with Boris Levenson, who was a pupil of Nikolai Rimsky-Korsakov. He became a well-known conductor on stage and on air, and in 1946 initiated the Carnegie Hall "Pops" concerts with members of the New York Philharmonic. In 1947 he played the role of Tchaikovsky in the film Carnegie Hall, conducting the film score as well. He was guest conductor with, among others, the Buffalo Symphony Orchestra, the Miami Symphony Orchestra, the Saint Louis Symphony Orchestra and the NBC Symphony of the Air.

D'Artega wrote over 50 songs. Perhaps his most widely recognized composition in the U.S. is "The NBC Chimes Theme".

One of D'Artega's earlier ventures was D'Artega's All-Girl Orchestra, a twenty piece show band.  The group was formed in New York City in 1942 and appeared in the Broadway play called "Hair Pin Harmony".  As a result of that success, the group was booked by the newly formed United Service Organization (USO) Camp Shows.  The group traveled coast to coast playing at various military bases, ending in California where they were featured in the Paramount Pictures release "You Can’t Ration Love".

The All-Girl Orchestra continued with the USO and traveled throughout the European and Pacific theaters during World War II.  The first tour started in Italy and followed the advance of Allied troops into Germany, France, and Czechoslovakia.   The orchestra continued service with the USO traveling to China, Japan, and islands in the Pacific.  D'Artega was not only the inspiration, but wrote, arranged, and conducted the group.

External links
 Gloria Parker Collection of Alfonso D'Artega Materials, 1942-2002 at the Library of Congress
 
 

American male composers
Hispanic and Latino American musicians
Mexican emigrants to the United States
Mexican composers
Mexican male composers
1907 births
1998 deaths
American musicians of Mexican descent
20th-century American composers
20th-century American male musicians
Musicians from Guanajuato